"What's Love Got to Do with It" is a song written by Graham Lyle and Terry Britten, and recorded by American singer Tina Turner for her fifth studio album, Private Dancer (1984). Capitol Records released it as a single from Private Dancer in May 1984 and became Turner's biggest-selling single.

Although Turner had already scored a late-1983 top 30 hit with her rendition of Al Green's "Let's Stay Together", "What's Love Got to Do with It" gave her first and only Billboard Hot 100 number-one single, selling over 2,000,000 copies worldwide. At the time, aged 44, Turner became the oldest solo female artist to top the Hot 100. It was the second-biggest single of 1984 in the United States and the 17th-biggest in the United Kingdom, where it peaked at number three on the UK Singles Chart. "What's Love Got to Do with It" received three awards at the 27th Annual Grammy Awards: Record of the Year, Song of the Year and Best Female Pop Vocal Performance. In 1993, the song's title was used as the title for the biographical film based on Turner's life.

In 2012, "What's Love Got to Do with It" was inducted into the Grammy Hall of Fame, giving Turner her third Grammy Hall of Fame award. The song ranked number 309 on Rolling Stone list of the "500 Greatest Songs of All Time" and at 134 in their 2021 update. It also ranked number 38 on RIAA's "Songs of the Century" list. Several musical artists have covered "What's Love Got to Do with It" and experienced commercial success with their renditions. American rapper Warren G released a hip hop version in 1996, and in July 2020, Norwegian DJ and producer Kygo released a remix of the song.

Background and recording
The song was written by Terry Britten and Graham Lyle, who originally offered it to Cliff Richard, but it was rejected. It was then given to Phyllis Hyman, who wanted to do the song, but Arista Records head Clive Davis would not allow her. The song then was offered to Donna Summer, who has stated she sat with it for a couple of years but never recorded it. Some months before Turner recorded the song, the British pop group Bucks Fizz were offered it. Member Jay Aston requested to sing lead on the track after hearing the demo, but was told by the producer that it was unsuitable for a female lead vocal. The group went on to record it in February 1984, but sung by male member Bobby G. Aston recalls the demo was very similar to the eventual Tina Turner version, but their finished version was in a very different style. It was intended for possible inclusion on their next album I Hear Talk but was shelved when Turner released her version first. The Bucks Fizz version went unreleased until it was included on a re-issue of their Are You Ready album in 2000. The Original Bucks Fizz included the song in their reunion concert tour in October 2009.

Composition
The song is performed in the key of A minor with a tempo of 98 beats per minute in common time.  The key transposes to B minor after the second chorus.  Turner's vocals span from E3 to D5.

Critical reception
Mark Millan of The Daily Vault described "What's Love Got to Do with It" as "three minutes and 48 seconds of pop perfection". He noted that it is a "soft synth-driven track countered by Turner's battle weary voice, barely hiding the cynic in her", and stated that the song "reeks of attitude". A reviewer from People Magazine noted "the sophisticated pop" of the song, adding that it has "the characteristic flair and energy that have made Tina the envy of every singer this side of Aretha."

Chart performance
Until the release of "What's Love Got to Do with It", Tina Turner had not had a US top-ten single since the early 1970s. The single went to number one on the US Billboard Hot 100 and remained there for three weeks, giving Turner her first and only solo number-one hit in the U.S. Turner was 44 when the song hit number one, at the time making her the oldest female solo artist to place a number-one single on the US Hot 100.

The song also spent five weeks at number two on the Billboard Hot Black Singles chart, from July 14 to August 18, 1984, "When Doves Cry", by Prince, being the reason it never reached its number-one spot. At the end of the year, the song was ranked the second-best-performing song of 1984 on the Billboard Year-End Hot 100, behind the aforementioned "When Doves Cry".

Worldwide, the song did well on the music charts, reaching number one in Australia and Canada. It peaked at number three in New Zealand and on the UK Singles Chart, becoming her highest-charting single on the latter chart alongside "River Deep – Mountain High" and "We Don't Need Another Hero (Thunderdome)". Elsewhere, the song reached the top 10 in many European countries, including the top 5 in Ireland, Sweden, and Austria. It also reached number two in South Africa.

Music video
The accompanying music video for "What's Love Got to Do with It" features Turner walking down the street in a leather miniskirt, engaging with the public, intercut with scenes where she is singing directly to camera. The video was shot in New York City during the spring of 1984. Pamela Springsteen, Bruce Springsteen's sister from Sleepaway Camp 2, makes an appearance as a street dancer along with Vanessa Bell Calloway, who would later portray the fictional character of Jackie (Turner's friend) in the 1993 film What's Love Got to Do with It. The video was directed by Mark Robinson.

An alternate black-and-white video directed by Bud Schaetzle features Tina singing the song against a black background while couples argue in a bar.

Accolades
The song received three awards at the 1985 Grammy Awards: Record of the Year, Song of the Year, and Best Female Pop Vocal Performance. Turner's live performance of the song at the Grammy show was released on the 1994 album Grammy's Greatest Moments Volume I.

The music video for the song claimed a prize at the MTV Video Music Awards in 1985 for "Best Female Video".

In 2012, "What's Love Got to Do with It" was inducted into the Grammy Hall of Fame.

Legacy and impact
The name of the song was used as the title of the 1993 biopic based on Turner's life. The first line of the song's chorus was interpolated in the 2002 song "What's Luv?" by rapper Fat Joe and R&B singer Ashanti. In 2018, a cover of the song was released as a non-album single by singer, La'Porsha Renae. Mickey Guyton performed the song at the 2021 Rock and Roll Hall of Fame Induction Ceremony.

Official versions/remixes
 Album version – 3:48
 Extended remix – 5:43
 Kygo rearrangement (2020) – 3:28

Credits and personnel

 Tina Turner – lead vocals
 Terry Britten – guitar, background vocals
 Nick Glennie-Smith – keyboards
 Graham Jarvis – Oberheim DX
 Billy Livsey – Yamaha DX7 (synth harmonica solo)
 Simon Morton – percussion
 Tessa Niles – background vocals

Production

 Terry Britten – producer
 John Hudson – engineer & mixing

Charts

Weekly charts

Year-end charts

Decade-end charts

Certifications and sales

Warren G version

"What's Love Got to Do with It" was also recorded by American artists Warren G and Adina Howard for the Supercop soundtrack. The song both sampled and interpolated the chorus of Tina Turner's 1984 song of the same name, though Warren G replaced the original lyrics with his own. "What's Love Got to Do with It" became a hit, making it to 32 on the US Billboard Hot 100, becoming Warren G's third top-forty single, as well as number five on the Billboard Hot Rap Singles chart. The single found greater success outside the US, peaking at number one in New Zealand, number two in Australia, Sweden, and the United Kingdom, and reaching the top 10 in an additional nine countries.

Critical reception
British magazine Music Week rated Warren G's cover of "What's Love Got to Do with It" four out of five in their review.

Music video
A music video was produced to promote the single, directed by Joseph Kahn. It features footage of Warren G and Adina Howard performing the song, with clips from the film Police Story 3: Super Cop. Jackie Chan also appears near the end of the video, dancing along with the artists.

Track listing
A-side
 "What's Love Got to Do with It?" (album version) – 4:17
 "What's Love Got to Do with It?" (clean radio version) – 4:17

B-side
 "What's Love Got to Do with It?" (a cappella) – 4:15
 "What's Love Got to Do with It?" (instrumental) – 4:15

Charts

Weekly charts

Year-end charts

Certifications

Kygo version

A remix of the song was released as a single by Norwegian DJ and record producer Kygo and Tina Turner. The song was released on July 17, 2020.

Background
Talking about the song, Kygo said, "'What's Love Got To Do With It?' is one of my all time favourite songs and it feels surreal to get the opportunity to work with such a legendary artist. Can't wait for you all to hear it!" He also said in a statement, "I couldn't be more excited to collaborate with Tina Turner, who is an icon that I grew up listening to. 'What's Love Got To Do With It' is one of my all-time favorite songs so to have a chance to rework it has been a very special moment in my career. I love working around timeless vocals and although it's challenging to preserve elements of the original track and adding my own touch, I'm extremely happy with how it turned out!"

Music video
A music video to accompany the release of "What's Love Got to Do with It" was first released onto YouTube on July 16, 2020. The video is directed by Sarah Bahbah and features Laura Harrier and Charles Michael Davis as star-crossed lovers who, despite looking on paper as having a strong and playful relationship, behind the scenes the couple lacks a deep emotional connection to last. In the end, one of them must walk away.

Personnel
Credits adapted from Tidal.
 Kyrre Gørvell-Dahll – producer, composer, associated performer, lyricist
 Graham Lyle – lyricist
 Terry Britten – lyricist
 Tina Turner – associated performer, lead vocals
 Randy Merrill – mastering engineer
 Serban Ghenea – mixing engineer

Charts

Weekly charts

Year-end charts

Certifications

See also

 List of Billboard Hot 100 number-one singles of 1984
 List of number-one singles of 2020 (Poland)

References

1980s ballads
1984 singles
1984 songs
1996 singles
2020 singles
Tina Turner songs
Adina Howard songs
Bucks Fizz songs
Kygo songs
Warren G songs
Billboard Hot 100 number-one singles
Cashbox number-one singles
Capitol Records singles
Contemporary R&B ballads
Funk ballads
Grammy Award for Record of the Year
Grammy Award for Song of the Year
Grammy Award for Best Female Pop Vocal Performance
Grammy Hall of Fame Award recipients
Interscope Records singles
MCA Records singles
MTV Video Music Award for Best Female Video
Music videos directed by Joseph Kahn
Number-one singles in Australia
Number-one singles in New Zealand
Number-one singles in Poland
Pop ballads
RPM Top Singles number-one singles
Song recordings produced by Kygo
Songs written by Graham Lyle
Songs written by Terry Britten
Sony Music singles